London Buses route 1 is a Transport for London contracted bus route in London, England. Running between Canada Water and Tottenham Court Road station, it is operated by London Central.

History

Route 1 was one of the first motorbus routes to be introduced in London. It was in operation by November 1908. By the time the London Passenger Transport Board took over its operations in 1933, it operated from Willesden garage to Lewisham. In June 1956, the Willesden to Marylebone station section was replaced by route 176.

Despite subsequent route changes, it continues to serve part of its original route, between Elephant & Castle and Aldwych.

On 3 October 2009, East Thames Buses was sold to London General, which included a five-year contract to operate route 1. London General commenced a further contract on 1 October 2016. It is operated out of Morden Wharf garage with a peak vehicle requirement of 17 Wright Gemini 3 buses.

In November 2021 Transport for London launched a successful consultation with a view of merging routes 1 and 168 to form a continuous service between Hampstead Heath and Canada Water, as well as re-routing route 188 to serve its former terminus at Tottenham Court Road. These changes are expected to come into effect in September 2023.

Current route
Route 1 operates via these primary locations:
Canada Water bus station   
Surrey Quays station 
Southwark Park Warndon Street
South Bermondsey 
Bricklayers Arms
New Kent Road
Elephant & Castle station  
St George's Circus 
The Old Vic
Waterloo station  
South Bank
Waterloo Bridge
Aldwych
Holborn station 
Tottenham Court Road station

References

External links 

 

Bus routes in London
Transport in the London Borough of Camden
Transport in the London Borough of Lambeth
Transport in the London Borough of Southwark
Transport in the City of Westminster